Tropidosaura gularis, also known commonly as the Cape mountain lizard and the yellow-striped mountain lizard, is a species of lizard in the family Lacertidae. The species is endemic to South Africa.

Habitat
The preferred natural habitat of T. gularis is shrubland.

Description

Diet
T. gularis is insectivorous, preying predominantly on bees and flies.

Reproduction
T. gularis is oviparous. An adult female may lay a clutch of 4–8 eggs, each of which measures on average 11.5 x 7.5 mm (0.45 x 0.30 in).

References

Further reading
FitzSimons VF (1943). The Lizards of South Africa. Pretoria: Transvaal Museum. xvi + 528 pp. (Tropidosaura gularis, p. 304).
Hewitt J (1927). "Further descriptions of reptiles and batrachians from South Africa". Records of the Albany Museum, Grahamstown 3 (5): 371–415. (Tropidosaura gularis, new species, p. 387).

Tropidosaura
Reptiles described in 1927
Endemic fauna of South Africa
Taxa named by John Hewitt (herpetologist)